Mosher's acid, or α-methoxy-α-trifluoromethylphenylacetic acid (MTPA) is a carboxylic acid which was first used by Harry Stone Mosher as a chiral derivatizing agent. It is a chiral molecule, consisting of R and S enantiomers.

Applications
As a chiral derivatizing agent, it reacts with an alcohol or amine of unknown stereochemistry to form an ester or amide. The absolute configuration of the ester or amide is then determined by proton and/or 19F NMR spectroscopy.

Mosher's acid chloride, the acid chloride form, is sometimes used because it has better reactivity.

See also 
 Pirkle's alcohol

References

Stereochemistry
Carboxylic acids
Trifluoromethyl compounds
Phenyl compounds